Michael Kesse Frimpong (born 29 November 1986), better known by his stage name Kesse, is a Ghanaian singer and songwriter. He rose to fame after winning the fourth season of TV3's Mentor. He participated in season 2 of Project Fame West Africa and finished first runner-up to Chidinma. Kesse released his debut studio album The Prodigy in 2012. It was supported by the singles "The Ugly Truth", "The More I Cry", "Superstar", and "Treat Her Royal", featuring Sarkodie.

Early life and musical career

Michael Kesse Frimpong was born in 1986, to Mr. and Mrs. Frimpong. He is the only boy child of his family. Kesse was drawn to music at an early age and was referred to as Mike during his high school days at Nkawkaw. He gained prominence after releasing his debut single "Oh Yes", a reggae-dancehall song which earned him Best Male Vocal of the Year at the 2012 Ghana Music Awards. Kesse decided to pursue a professional career in music after participating in Mentor and Project Fame West Africa. Kesse often sings in his native language Twi, and is fluent in English, Ga, and French. He has worked with artists such as Sarkodie, Okyeame Kwame, Guru, Raquel, Appietus, Efya, Ayigbe Edem and Kwaw Kese. 

On 25 May 2013, he performed at the Kwame Nkrumah Circle in Accra. His debut studio album, titled Prodigy, was supported by four singles: "The Ugly Truth", "The More I Cry", "Superstar", and "Treat Her Royal", featuring Sarkodie. He released four music videos to support the singles. Kesse received a total of four nominations at the 2013 Ghana Music Awards, and was nominated twice in the Best Collaboration of the Year and Hip Life Song of the Year categories.

Discography

Studio albums
2012: Prodigy

Singles
 "Oh Yes"
 "Treat Her Royal" (featuring Sarkodie)
 "Asa Bone"
 "Two Eyes"
 "Kwahu Bipo" (featuring Tinny)
 "Obiba" (featuring Efya)

Awards

Ghana Music Awards

|-
|rowspan="4"|2013
|"Azonto Fiesta" (with Sakordie and Appietus)
|rowspan="2"| Best Collaboration of the Year
| 
|-
|"Sika" (Okyeame Kwame)
| 
|-
|"Azonto Fiest" 
|rowspan="2"| Hip Life song of the Year
| 
|-
|"Treat Her Royal" (featuring Sarkodie)
| 
|-
|2012
|rowspan="1"|"Oh Yes" 
| Best Male Vocal of the Year
|

References

1986 births
Living people
21st-century Ghanaian male singers
21st-century Ghanaian singers
Ghanaian composers